Sheri Foster (born October 19, 1957) is an American actress and registered member of the Cherokee nation from Texas. Her theatre experiences include The Independence of Eddie Rose, Death of a Miner, God of Vengeance, and touring with the Native American Theater group Mystic Voices. Her film work includes U-Turn (for which she was honored with a Best Supporting Actress Award from First Americans in the Arts), Naturally Native, Secondhand Heart, and Shouting Secrets. TV credits include House, Crazy Horse, Coyote Waits, and Unbreakable Kimmy Schmidt.

Personal life
Born in Texas in 1957, Foster is a citizen of the Cherokee Nation.

Filmography

References

External links

"Native Voices", Native Voices Artists Ensemble, Autry National Center 
Unbreakable Kimmy Schmidt' Has Two Native American Actors

1957 births
Living people
American stage actresses
American television actresses
American film actresses
20th-century American actresses
21st-century American actresses
Cherokee Nation artists
Actresses from Texas
Native American actresses
20th-century Native Americans
21st-century Native Americans
20th-century Native American women
21st-century Native American women